The 2014-15 Ligue Inter-Régions de football is the ? season of the league under its current title and ? season under its current league division format. A total of 64 teams (16 in each group) will be contesting the league. The league is scheduled to start on September 23, 2014.

League table

Group West

Group Centre-West

Group Centre-East

Group East

References

Inter-Régions Division seasons
4